Sharmili Ahmed (8 May 1947 – 8 July 2022) was a Bangladeshi television and film actress.

Early life
Majeda Mullick was born on 8 May 1947 in Belur Chok village, Murshidabad. She passed matriculation examination from Rajshahi PN Girls High School.

Career
Ahmed started her career as a radio announcer and drama artiste in Rajshahi Radio in 1962. She made her debut as a film actress in 1964 and as a television actress in 1968. She worked in Dompoti, the first ever drama serial on Bangladesh Television. She acted in a mother role for the first time in the drama Agun, directed by Mohammad Mohsin in 1976. In a career spanning more than 50 years she acted in nearly 400 films and 150 television programs.

Works

Television 
 Malancha
 Dompoti 
 Brishtir Porey (2005)
 Amader Anando Bari (2005)
 Aguntuk (2005)
 Poshak (2005)
 Anchol (2006)
 Chena Manusher Panchalee (2007)
 Dhupchhaya (2009)
 Uposhonghar (2010)
 Poush Phaguner Pala (2011)
 Chheleti (2011)
 Abar Hawa Bodol (2014)

Films 
 Jugnoo (1968)
 Shuorani Duorani (1968)
 Abirbhab (1968) - Luna Chowdhury
 Alingon (1969)
 Polatok (1973)
 Agun (1976)
 Bashundhara (1977) - Chhobi's Sister in Law
 Rupali Shoikote (1979) 
 Aradhona (1979) - Parul
 Emiler Goyenda Bahini (1980)
 Ashar Alo (1982)
 Dahan (1985) - Asma / Mrs. Mostak
 Premik (1985)
 Hushiar (1988)
 Laal Golap 
 Beyadob
 Streer Paona (1991) - Kabir's Mother
 Tyag (1993) - Rayhan's Mother
 Bikkhov (1994) - Zihad's Mother 
 Prem Juddho (1994)
 Tomake Chai (1996) - Sagor's Mother 
 Hangor Nodi Grenade (1997)
 Ami Tomari (1999)
 Sobaito Sukhi Hote Chai (2000)
 Dhawa (2000)
 Milon Hobe Koto Dine (2002)
 Swami Chhintai (2004)
 Amar Swapno Tumi (2005) - Shahed's Mother 
 Mohabbat Zindabad (2005)
 Bhalobasha Bhalobasha (2006)
 Na Bolona (2006)
 Chachchu (2006)
 Judge Er Raye Fashi (2007)
 Jhontu Montu Dui Bhai (2007)
 Dukhini Zohora (2007)
 Tip Tip Brishty (2008)
 Akash Chhowa Bhalobasha (2008)
 Swami Niye Juddho (2008)
 Golapi Ekhon Bilatey (2010)
 Matir Thikana (2011)
 Meherjaan (2011) - Meher's Mother
 Moner Jala (2011)
 Se Amar Mon Kereche (2012)
 Akash Koto Dure (2014)
 71 Er Maa Jononi (2014)
 Prem Korbo Tomar Sathe (2014)
 Swargo Theke Norok (2015)
 Ochena Hridoy (2015)
 Ek Prithibi Prem (2016)
 Raat Jaga Phool (2021)

Personal life
Ahmed had a daughter Tanima. She had a younger sister theatre actor and activist Wahida Mollick Jolly.

Death 
She died from cancer on 8 July 2022 at the age of 75.

Explanatory notes

References

External links
 

1947 births
2022 deaths
Bangladeshi television actresses
Bangladeshi film actresses
Best Supporting Actress Bachsas Award winners
People from Murshidabad district
Deaths from cancer in Bangladesh